Cummersdale was a railway station on the Maryport and Carlisle Railway (M&CR) serving Cummersdale in Cumbria. The station was opened by the M&CR in 1858 and lay in the Parish of Cummersdale near to the village of High Cummersdale.

History 

Cummersdale station was opened by the Maryport & Carlisle Railway in 1858. At grouping in 1923 the M&CR became a part of the London, Midland and Scottish Railway.  It was one of several lightly used intermediate stations on this section of the route to be closed by the British Transport Commission (in 1951) in the years immediately after the nationalisation of the UK rail network. The station was served by workmens trains until the early 1960s. The main Carlisle-Maryport line (completed in 1845) remains open and forms part of the Cumbrian Coast Line between Carlisle and Barrow in Furness. 

The station had two through platforms. It lay close to a dye works and overlooked Carlisle racecourse.

George Stephenson was the engineer for the Maryport and Carlisle Railway and his one major engineering structure was the 57-metre-long, three span Cummersdale viaduct which spans the River Caldew at a 52° skew two miles south of Carlisle. This viaduct was the most significant structure on the railway which was opened as a single line, the current twin track viaduct structure was a 1910 upgrade. This bridge was rebuilt in 2012.

References 
Notes

Sources

Further reading

External links
 Cummersdale Station

Disused railway stations in Cumbria
Former Maryport and Carlisle Railway stations
Railway stations in Great Britain opened in 1858
Railway stations in Great Britain closed in 1951
1843 establishments in England